Wuthering Heights is an opera in a prologue and three acts with music and a libretto by Carlisle Floyd. The work is adapted from Emily Brontë's 1847 novel of the same name. The opera premiered at the Santa Fe Opera on July 16, 1958 in a production directed by Irving Guttman. A revised version of the work was performed at the New York City Opera in 1959 with a cast that notably included Phyllis Curtin, Patricia Neway, and Frank Porretta.

Roles

Recording 
Wuthering Heights Georgia Jarman  Kelly Markgraf  Florentine Opera Company; Milwaukee Symphony Orchestra,  Joseph Mechavich Reference Recordings: FR-721

References

Operas by Carlisle Floyd
English-language operas
Operas
1958 operas
Operas set in England
Operas based on novels
Floyd